Cuesta is a Spanish surname. Notable people with the surname include:

Alexander Cuesta (born 1966), Colombian musician
Belén Cuesta (born 1984) Spanish model and actress
Frank Cuesta (born 1971) Spanish adventurer and television presenter
Gloria Cuesta (died 1987), Spanish aviator
Gregorio García de la Cuesta (1741–1811), Spanish general of the Peninsular War
Íñigo Cuesta (born 1969), Spanish road bicycle racer
Inma Cuesta (born 1980) Spanish actress
Ismael Fernández de la Cuesta (born 1940), Spanish musicologist
Jaime Cuesta (born 1981), Mexican footballer
Jorge Cuesta (1903–1942), Mexican chemist, writer and editor
José de la Cuesta (born 1983), Colombian footballer
María Mercedes Cuesta (born 1973), Ecuadorian journalist and politician
Mario Fernández Cuesta (born 1988), Spanish footballer
Michael Cuesta (born 1963), American film and television director
Nemesio Fernández-Cuesta (1928–2009), Spanish businessman, journalist and politician
Pablo González Cuesta (born 1968), Spanish writer
Paul de la Cuesta (born 1988), Spanish alpine skier
Raimundo Fernández-Cuesta (1897–1992), Spanish politician
Víctor Cuesta (born 1988), Argentine footballer
Yamith Cuesta (born 1989), Colombian footballer

Spanish-language surnames